Mircea Lucescu (born 29 July 1945) is a Romanian professional football manager and former player, who is currently head coach of Ukrainian Premier League club Dynamo Kyiv. He is one of the most decorated managers of all time.

Lucescu is also one of the most successful players of the Romanian league championship, having won all of his seven titles with Dinamo București. Apart from the latter club, he had spells at Știința București and Corvinul Hunedoara, and made 70 appearances for the Romania national team, which he captained in the 1970 FIFA World Cup.

Lucescu has coached various sides in Romania, Italy, Turkey, Ukraine and Russia. He is well known for his twelve-year stint in charge of Shakhtar Donetsk, where he became the most successful coach in the team's history by winning eight Ukrainian Premier League titles, six Ukrainian Cups, seven Ukrainian Super Cups and the 2008–09 UEFA Cup. He also won trophies in Ukraine with rival Dynamo Kyiv, as well as Divizia A titles with Dinamo București and Rapid București, and Turkish Süper Lig titles with Galatasaray and Beşiktaş. 

Lucescu was named Romania Coach of the Year in 2004, 2010, 2012, 2014 and 2021, and Ukraine Coach of the Year in 2006 and between 2008 and 2014. In 2013, he was awarded the Manager of the Decade award in Romania, and in 2015 became the fifth person to coach in 100 UEFA Champions League matches, joining the likes of Alex Ferguson, Carlo Ancelotti, Arsène Wenger and José Mourinho. He is also ranked second behind Ferguson in terms of official trophies won, with 38.

Playing career

Club career
Mircea Lucescu was born on 29 July 1945 in Bucharest, Romania and started playing football as a junior at Școala Sportivă 2 București. He was brought at Dinamo București by coach Traian Ionescu, where he made his Divizia A debut on 21 June 1964 in a 5–2 victory against Rapid București. In his first two seasons at Dinamo, Lucescu won the title in both of them, playing a total of 3 Divizia A games, being loaned for the following two seasons at Divizia B club, Știința București. After the loan ended, he returned to play for The Red Dogs winning another four titles, in the first he contributed with 3 goals scored in 23 matches, in the second he played 28 games and scored 12 goals, in the third he made 31 appearances with 4 goals and in the last one he scored 7 goals in 19 matches. Lucescu has a total of 12 seasons spent at Dinamo, in which he appeared in 250 Divizia A games in which he scored 57 goals, including 9 in the derby against Steaua București, he also scored a double in the 3–1 victory from the 1968 Cupa României Final against Rapid București and he played 15 games in which he scored 3 goals in European competitions (including 3 appearances in the Inter-Cities Fairs Cup). In July 1977, he went to play for Corvinul Hunedoara, where in January 1979 he became the team's coach, while still being an active player, but the team relegated at the end of the season to Divizia B and Lucescu stayed with the club, promoting back to the first division after one year and helping the club finish 3rd in the 1981–82 Divizia A, retiring from his playing career after that season. He came out of retirement when he was coach at Dinamo București because many of the team's players were called at a Romania's national team cantonment in order to prepare for the 1990 World Cup, so he registered himself as a player and on 16 May 1990 he entered the field in the 76th minute in order to replace Ionel Fulga in a 1–1 against Sportul Studențesc București, thus becoming champion as a player and a coach in that season and at 44 years, 9 months and 17 days he is the oldest player that appeared in a Divizia A match, a competition in which he has a total of 362 matches and 78 goals scored.

International career
Mircea Lucescu has a total of 64 appearances of which in 23 he was captain and 9 goals scored for Romania, making his debut under coach Ilie Oană while being a player in the second league at Știința București on 2 November 1966 in a 4–2 victory against Switzerland at the Euro 1968 qualifiers in which he gained a total of 6 appearances and two goals scored in the both legs against Cyprus. He played 6 games at the successful 1970 World Cup qualifiers, also being used by coach Angelo Niculescu in all three group matches as captain at the final tournament as Romania did not advance to the next stage and at the last game against Brazil which ended with a 3–2 loss, Lucescu bought the team's blue equipment for that game from his own money, because the Romanian Football Federation provided just one set of equipment which was yellow, same as the ones of the Brazilians. He played 7 matches and scored two goals at the 1972 Euro qualifiers, managing to reach the quarter-finals where Romania was defeated by Hungary, who advanced to the final tournament. Mircea Lucescu also played two games at the 1974 World Cup qualifiers, three games in which he scored a goal in a 3–1 victory against Greece at the 1973–76 Balkan Cup, six games in which he scored a goal in a 6–1 victory against Denmark at the Euro 1976 qualifiers, making his last appearance for the national team on 4 April 1979 in a 2–2 against Spain at the Euro 1980 qualifiers.

For representing his country at the 1970 World Cup, Lucescu was decorated by President of Romania Traian Băsescu on 25 March 2008 with the Ordinul "Meritul Sportiv" – (The Medal "The Sportive Merit") class III.

Managerial career

Corvinul Hunedoara
Mircea Lucescu was taught and learned many things about coaching from Viorel Mateianu, being very impressed by his working methods, coming to study his training sessions at FC Baia Mare, sometimes asking Mateianu to extend his training sessions so he can see more of his methods, also he went to his home where they would talk all night about football and draw tactical game schemes together. He started coaching while still being an active player at Corvinul Hunedoara in January 1979, when he replaced Ilie Savu, his first match taking place on 28 February 1979 in the sixteenths-finals of the 1978–79 Cupa României, losing with 3–1 after extra time in favor of Divizia B club, Metalul București. Three days later, he made his Divizia A debut in a 2–0 victory against Politehnica Iași in which he scored a goal, however the team relegated at the end of the season to Divizia B, but Lucescu stayed with the club, promoting back to the first division after one year and helping the club finish 3rd in the 1981–82 Divizia A, after which he left the club in order to dedicate on his work at the national team, which he was coaching simultaneously since November 1981. During his period spent at Corvinul, Lucescu showed his availability of discovering and promoting young players like Ioan Andone, Mircea Rednic, Michael Klein, Dorin Mateuț or Romulus Gabor.

Romania
Mircea Lucescu has a total of 58 matches managed as Romania's coach, making his debut on 11 November 1981 in a 0–0 against Switzerland at the 1982 World Cup qualifiers. He qualified the team at Euro 1984 by winning a qualification group composed of 1982 World Cup winner, Italy with whom he earned a 0–0 on their ground and a 1–0 home victory, Czechoslovakia, Sweden and Cyprus. At the final tournament, which was composed of 8 teams, Romania earned a point after a 1–1 against Spain, but lost the other two games, 2–1 with West Germany and 1–0 with Portugal, leaving the competition without passing the group stage. He was close to win the qualification at the 1986 World Cup, finishing at just one point below second place, Northern Ireland, his last game managed taking place on 10 September 1986 in a 4–0 victory against Austria at the Euro 1988 qualifiers. He is also the coach that gave Gheorghe Hagi his debut at the national team at age 18 in a friendly against Norway which ended 0–0, also giving him the captain armband at the age of 20.

Dinamo București

Lucescu was named coach at Dinamo București in November 1985, while still being coach at Romania's national team and at the end of his first season spent at the club, he managed to win a Cupa României with a 1–0 victory in the final against rival and recently European Cup winner, Steaua București. Over the course of almost 5 years, he created a team by promoting players from the club's youth center like Bogdan Stelea, Ionuț Lupescu and Florin Răducioiu, transferred young players like Dănuț Lupu and Ioan Sabău, mixing them with players he coached at Corvinul like Ioan Andone, Mircea Rednic, Michael Klein and Dorin Mateuț, thus creating a team that reached the quarter-finals in the 1988–89 European Cup Winners' Cup where they were eliminated on the away goals rule after 1–1 on aggregate by Sampdoria, and in the following season they won the Divizia A title, the Cupa României and reached the semi-finals in the 1989–90 European Cup Winners' Cup where they were eliminated after 2–0 on aggregate by Anderlecht.

Pisa
After the 1989 Romanian Revolution, Lucescu went in July 1990 to coach in Italy at Serie A club, Pisa where after a good start, in round six of the season after a 6–3 loss against Inter Milan he had his first problems with the club's president, Romeo Anconetani, however he managed to stay 24 rounds, being dismissed in March 1991, but the team relegated at the end of the season. During this period he coached 20-year old Diego Simeone and met Adriano Bacconi, a fitness trainer who was put by Lucescu to write statistical data about players during matches, as he previously did that at Corvinul, because he wanted to know more details possible about the players performances. He and Adriano Bacconi also worked together at Brescia where in 1994 they invested each 35.000$ in order to create a software called FARM (Football Athletic Results Manager) which was the first football data monitoring program, afterwards in 1996 Lucescu sold his part of the company which became known as Digital Soccer Project and Bacconi sold it to Panini for 2 million euros.

Brescia
Mircea Lucescu signed with Serie B club, Brescia in July 1991, promoting after just one season to Serie A. In the following season he relegated after a play-off lost against Udinese, promoting again after one Serie B season in which he also won the 1993–94 Anglo-Italian Cup, but the following season the club relegated once more, Lucescu being dismissed before the end of the season. He was called back shortly, to lead the team again in Serie B, but was dismissed again because of poor results, the club risking to fall in Serie C. During this period, the club was nicknamed "Brescia Romena", because Lucescu brought Romanian players Gheorghe Hagi, Florin Răducioiu, Dorin Mateuț, Ioan Sabău and Dănuț Lupu at the club, also he brought 15-year old Andrea Pirlo to train with the senior team, but could not give him his senior debut because the rules of the federation did not allow players so young to play for senior squads.

Reggiana
In July 1996, Lucescu signed with Serie A club, Reggiana, bringing Ioan Sabău with him, but his spell lasted until November 1996, being dismissed because of poor results, the team finishing on the last place in the end of the season.

Rapid București
In July 1997, Mircea Lucescu returned in Romania, coaching at Rapid București where he created a team by promoting young players like Bogdan Lobonț, Răzvan Raț and Daniel Pancu, mixing them with players he coached in the past like Dănuț Lupu, Ioan Sabău and Mircea Rednic, thus creating a team that won the 1997–98 Cupa României and after a short spell at Inter Milan, he returned at Rapid, winning the 1998–99 Divizia A, which was the first championship title won by the club after 32 years, also winning the 1999 Supercupa României.

Inter Milan
In December 1998, Lucescu was named coach at Inter Milan, working with players such as Ronaldo, Roberto Baggio, Andrea Pirlo, Javier Zanetti or Ivan Zamorano and managing to reach the quarter-finals in the 1998–99 Champions League, being eliminated with 3–1 on aggregate by Alex Ferguson's Manchester United which eventually won the competition, leaving the club in March 1999, one of the reasons being a conflict with Ronaldo.

Galatasaray
In June 2000, he replaced Fatih Terim at Turkish club Galatasaray, with whom, alongside Romanian players Gheorghe Hagi and Gheorghe Popescu he won the 2000 UEFA Super Cup after a 2–1 against Real Madrid. Under Lucescu's leadership, Galatasaray reached the quarter-finals on the UEFA Champions League during the 2000–01 season where after a 3–2 victory in the first leg, they lost with 3–0 in the second against Real Madrid. The following year, Galatasaray qualified to the second group phase of the Champions League and won the Turkish League title. Lucescu was sacked at the end of the season, despite winning the league championship, and was replaced by Fatih Terim.

Beşiktaş
Shortly after his departure from Galatasaray in June 2002, Lucescu signed a contract with rivals Beşiktaş, it was a very important season for Beşiktaş as in 2003, the Turkish club was celebrating its 100th year since its foundation and he managed to win the Turkish title, having only one loss and collecting 85 points – a record points tally in a single Süper Lig season, also reaching the 2002–03 UEFA Cup quarter-finals, losing with 3–1 on aggregate against Lazio Roma.  

In the following season, the team could not progress from a difficult Champions League group, but was able to get a ticket to the 2003–04 UEFA Cup by finishing third in its group – only to be knocked out by Valencia in the third round, who eventually went on to win the competition. On 25 January 2004, Beşiktaş played a home game against Samsunspor in the championship, referee Cem Papila showing five red cards to Beşiktaş players and after this match, the team's performance declined drastically and Lucescu could not stop the decline, blaming the Turkish Football Federation for one-sided decisions by the referees, leaving the club after finishing the championship on the 3rd position, claiming that his championship was stolen. During his period spent at the Beşiktaş, he bought Romanian players Daniel Pancu, Adrian Ilie and Marius Măldărășanu at the club.

Shakhtar Donetsk

In May 2004, Lucescu joined Ukrainian side Shakhtar Donetsk and led their rise to prominence in Ukraine the following years. His first trophy with the club came in the 2003–04 Ukrainian Cup, defeating Dnipro Dnipropetrovsk 2–0 in the final on 30 May. In his first full season with the club, he secured the 2004–05 Premier League title.

The following season, he secured both the Premier League and the Super Cup. He failed to win any trophies the following season, however, though he made up for it in the 2007–08 season, winning the Premier League title and the Ukrainian Cup. His only domestic success in the 2008–09 season came in the Super Cup, although he was able to guide Shakhtar to their first ever European trophy, winning the last UEFA Cup before it was renamed the UEFA Europa League. He won the final against Werder Bremen 2–1 after extra time.

The 2009–10 season saw Shakhtar regain the Premier League title. The 2010–11 season was very successful for Lucescu. He guided Shakhtar to a domestic treble, winning the Premier League, the Ukrainian Cup and the Super Cup. They also had their most successful Champions League campaign, reaching the quarter-final stage before being defeated by eventual winners Barcelona.

The following season saw Shakhtar retain their Premier League and Ukrainian Cup titles. This gave Lucescu his sixth Premier League and fourth Ukrainian Cup with the club. Shakhtar had a disappointing Champions League campaign, finishing in fourth place in their group. His son, Răzvan Lucescu, is a former goalkeeper who at several points managed Rapid București, a team his father had also previously managed. Coincidentally, Shakhtar and Rapid met in the group stage of the UEFA Cup, the duel was disputed in only one leg at Donetsk in November 2005 ending with 1–0 win for Rapid.

On 22 May 2009, Lucescu received, from the President of Romania Traian Băsescu, the National Order "Cross of Romania" in the rank of Knight, "as a sign of high appreciation of the entire football activity and the performances obtained as a coach, crowned by winning the UEFA Cup 2009, in the final in Istanbul" and on 29 May 2009 he was granted the title "Honorary citizen of Donetsk" by the city council of Donetsk for "earning the UEFA Cup, development and popularization of the Ukrainian football, improvement of the Donetsk, Donetsk region and Ukraine authority in the world".

In December 2009, he turned down an offer to coach the Ukraine national team, his reason being to avoid another potential clash with his son, Răzvan, who then managed the Romania national team and could qualify for UEFA Euro 2012, which Ukraine was to host.

Lucescu has won the Coach of the Year award in Ukraine in 2006, 2008, 2009, 2010, 2011, 2012, 2013 and 2014.

He led Shakhtar into the semi-finals of Europa League during his last season in charge, being eliminated by defending champions and eventual winners Sevilla. He announced his resignation in early 2016, ending a 12-year period in charge of Shakhtar and becoming the club's greatest manager. In his last match in charge, he won the 2015–16 Ukrainian Cup after defeating Zorya Luhansk 2–0 in the final.

In the beginning of his period spent at Shakhtar, Lucescu had Romanians Flavius Stoican, Cosmin Bărcăuan, Daniel Florea, Ciprian Marica and Răzvan Raț under his command, but only the latter stayed with him to win the 2008–09 UEFA Cup, in later years he relied heavily on young Brazilian players such as Willian, Fernandinho, Douglas Costa, Luiz Adriano, Elano, Alex Teixeira, Ilsinho, Jádson, Brandão or Matuzalém.

Zenit Saint Petersburg

On 24 May 2016, Lucescu agreed to a two-year deal with Russian club Zenit Saint Petersburg, with an extension option for another year. He was dismissed roughly one year later, as Zenit failed to qualify for the Champions League after finishing third in the Russian Premier League, but managed to win the 2016 Russian Super Cup after a 1–0 victory against CSKA Moscow.

Turkey
On 2 August 2017, he was appointed as the new head coach of Turkey, succeeding Fatih Terim. On his debut a month later, he lost 2–0 away to Ukraine in 2018 FIFA World Cup qualification. The team failed to qualify for the World Cup, with their campaign ending with a 3–0 home loss to Iceland in the penultimate fixture on 6 October.

In the inaugural season of the UEFA Nations League, Turkey were relegated to League C in November 2018. The following February, his contract was terminated by mutual consent.

Dynamo Kyiv
On 23 July 2020, Lucescu returned to Ukraine after signing a two-year contract with the main rival of his former club Shakhtar Donetsk, Dynamo Kyiv. His spell started in a controversial way, as he attempted to resign from his position after only a couple of days. The reason behind his actions was that Dynamo Kyiv fans fiercely protested the decision to hire Lucescu because of his long-term spell at Shakhtar. Dynamo president Ihor Surkis initially told press that he knew nothing about the resignation, and later that day both sides confirmed that their cooperation will in fact continue.

On 20 October, in Dynamo Kyiv's opening Champions League match of the season against Juventus, Lucescu became the oldest manager to take charge of a game in the competition, at the age of 75 years and 83 days; The match ended in a 2–0 home loss. Lucescu secured his first league title with Dynamo Kyiv on 25 April, following a 5–0 victory against Inhulets, and on 13 May he secured the double with a 1–0 win over Zorya Luhansk in the 2021 Ukrainian Cup Final. In his first season spent at the club, he transferred compatriot Tudor Băluță on a one-season loan from Brighton & Hove Albion.

Lucescu was living in Kyiv in February 2022 when Russia invaded Ukraine. He initially wanted to stay put, but fled to his homeland on the advice of the Romanian embassy, as a way to help Dynamo's foreign players get to safety.

Personal life
Lucescu is a polyglot. He speaks English, Portuguese, Spanish, Italian, French and Russian in addition to his native Romanian. He is often cited as telling his players that going to the theatre or reading a book is far more beneficial than going to clubs or restaurants. He also pressured his players to go to university. His son, Răzvan Lucescu, was also a footballer, and is currently managing PAOK.

On 15 July 2009, Lucescu suffered an attack of pre-infarct angina, and was operated in an emergency hospital in Donetsk.

On 6 January 2012, he was involved in a road accident in Bucharest and was seriously hurt.

Career statistics

Player

International goals
Scores and results list Romania's goal tally first, score column indicates score after each Lucescu goal.

Managerial

Managing Shakhtar

Honours

Player
Dinamo București
Divizia A: 1963–64, 1964–65, 1970–71, 1972–73, 1974–75, 1976–77, 1989–90
Cupa României: 1967–68
Corvinul Hunedoara
Divizia B: 1979–80

Manager
Corvinul Hunedoara
Divizia B: 1979–80
Dinamo București
Divizia A 1989–90
Cupa României: 1985–86, 1989–90
Brescia
Serie B: 1991–92
Anglo-Italian Cup: 1993–94
Rapid București
Divizia A: 1998–99
Cupa României: 1997–98
Supercupa României: 1999
Galatasaray
Süper Lig: 2001–02
UEFA Super Cup: 2000
Beşiktaş
Süper Lig: 2002–03
Shakhtar Donetsk

Ukrainian Premier League: 2004–05, 2005–06, 2007–08, 2009–10, 2010–11, 2011–12, 2012–13, 2013–14
Ukrainian Cup: 2003–04, 2007–08, 2010–11, 2011–12, 2012–13, 2015–16
Ukrainian Super Cup: 2005, 2008, 2010, 2012, 2013, 2014, 2015
UEFA Cup: 2008–09
Zenit Saint Petersburg
Russian Super Cup: 2016
Dynamo Kyiv
Ukrainian Premier League: 2020–21
Ukrainian Cup: 2020–21
Ukrainian Super Cup: 2020
Individual
Gazeta Sporturilor Romania Coach of the Year: 2004, 2010, 2012, 2014, 2021
European Coach of the Year – Alf Ramsey Award: 2009
Orders
Order of Merit (Ukraine) III degree (2006)
Order of The Sportive Merit (Romania) III degree (2008)
Order of the Star of Romania (2009)
Order of Merit (Ukraine) II degree (2009)
Order of Merit (Ukraine) I degree (2011)
Honorary Citizen of Donetsk

See also
List of UEFA Cup winning managers
List of UEFA Super Cup winning managers
List of longest managerial reigns in association football

Notes

References

Further reading

External links

 
 

1945 births
Living people
Footballers from Bucharest
Romanian footballers
CS Corvinul Hunedoara players
FC Dinamo București players
FC Sportul Studențesc București players
Olympic footballers of Romania
Romania international footballers
Association football midfielders
1970 FIFA World Cup players
Romanian football managers
CS Corvinul Hunedoara managers
FC Dinamo București managers
FC Rapid București managers
Pisa S.C. managers
Brescia Calcio managers
A.C. Reggiana 1919 managers
Inter Milan managers
Galatasaray S.K. (football) managers
Beşiktaş J.K. managers
FC Shakhtar Donetsk managers
FC Dynamo Kyiv managers
Serie A managers
Süper Lig managers
Ukrainian Premier League managers
Expatriate football managers in Italy
Romanian expatriate sportspeople in Italy
Expatriate football managers in Turkey
Romanian expatriate sportspeople in Turkey
Expatriate football managers in Ukraine
Romanian expatriate sportspeople in Ukraine
Romania national football team managers
Romanian expatriate football managers
UEFA Euro 1984 managers
UEFA Cup winning managers
Recipients of the Order of Merit (Ukraine), 3rd class
Recipients of the Order of Merit (Ukraine), 2nd class
Recipients of the Order of Merit (Ukraine), 1st class
Recipients of the Order of the Star of Romania
FC Zenit Saint Petersburg managers
Russian Premier League managers
Expatriate football managers in Russia
Romanian expatriate sportspeople in Russia
Turkey national football team managers